Wide World of Sports can refer to:

Wide World of Sports (Australian TV program), screened on the Nine Network
Wide World of Sports (American TV program), broadcast by the American Broadcasting Company
Nine's Wide World of Sports, sports coverage on Australia's Nine Network
ESPN Wide World of Sports Complex, an athletic complex located in Lake Buena Vista, Florida, formerly known as Disney's Wide World of Sports.
 Disney's Wide World of Sports Spirit Award.

See also
World of Sport (disambiguation)